

Tilhere was a medieval Bishop of Worcester. He was consecrated in 777. He died between 780 and 781.

Citations

References

External links
 

Bishops of Worcester
8th-century English bishops